Still Life with Lemons, Oranges and a Rose is an oil-on-canvas painting by Baroque Spanish artist Francisco de Zurbarán completed in 1633. It is currently displayed at the Norton Simon Museum in Pasadena, California as part of its permanent collection. It is the only still life signed and dated by him and is considered a masterwork of the genre.

Composition and analysis

The painting shows three groups of objects (a saucer of four citrons, a basket of oranges, and a saucer holding both a cup of water and a rose) resting on a table against a dark background. Each group of objects are placed equidistant from one another and form a spatial and geometrical balance due to their pyramidal organization. As described by Andreas Prater:

Norman Bryson writes:

Many of Zurbaran's works contained Christian themes, and the objects in the painting are often interpreted as having symbolic meaning as alluding to the Holy Trinity or as an homage to the Virgin Mary. 

Morten Lauridsen wrote in the Wall Street Journal:

Lauridsen has cited the painting as a major inspiration for his 1994 choral setting of O magnum mysterium.

References

Paintings by Francisco de Zurbarán
1633 paintings
Paintings in the collection of the Norton Simon Museum
Still life paintings